Lakeview Academy is a coeducational, private, college-preparatory school in Gainesville, Georgia, United States, for students from preschool through grade twelve. It opened during the period of desegregation of public schools in Gainesville.

Description 
Lakeview has a preschool/kindergarten program, lower school (first through fifth grades), middle school (grades six through eight), and upper school (grades nine through twelve). A nonprofit, it is accredited by the Southern Association of Independent Schools.

Built on a 90-acre campus, Lakeview facilities include preschool, lower school, middle school, and upper school division buildings, athletic complexes, a fine arts annex and a common student center. The 17,000-square-foot, two-story middle school building opened in 2017. The school also constructed a $2.5 million football stadium and athletic facility in 2020.

Curriculum 
Lakeview Academy offers college preparatory courses, including seventeen advanced placement courses and nine honors courses.

Fine arts courses include painting and drawing, sculpture and ceramics, photography, digital arts, theater, speech, drama, chorus, string orchestra, and band, as well as on-campus private music lessons.

Robotics classes are available in Singleton Hall.

Co-curricular activities 
The school's robotics team competes in regional and statewide tournaments. 

Lakeview Academy won the Georgia High School Association one-act play state title consecutively from 2013 to 2017. The title was subsequently lost in 2018, and brought back in 2021 with their production of Monty Python's Spamalot.

Lakeview Academy won the GHSA Region Literary Championship in 2017, placing first in six categories, and won the region championship 13 times from 2002–2017.

History                                                                                                                                                                                                                                                                                                                                                                                                             
From 1960 to 1970, public schools in Hall County were undergoing court ordered integration of public schools. In 1969, with the closure of Butler High School, Black students in Gainesville were integrated among the three remaining high schools. 

Physician Robert Tether helped charter Gainesville Academy as a private college preparatory school on August 21, 1968, appealing to parents who "wanted to form a new school that could give their kids a chance to be accepted into the college of their choice", according to Tether's son Rusty. After a year of fund-raising, the Gainesville Academy opened on North Bradford Street in September 1969, with classes for sixth- and seventh-graders. In 1970, it was advertised as "open to all who meet the acceptance criteria and pass the entrance examination, regardless of race, creed, or color".  

The academy was "initially providing Gainesville parents with an integration-free environment for their children", according to social historian Thomas Rasmussen.  Author Winfred E. Pitts wrote, "Lakeview Academy, established in 1970 in response to desegregation, continues to grow as an almost exclusively white private school." Based on interviews of the former superintendent and assistant superintendent of Gainesville's public schools, Pitts  wrote that although they each emphasized they could not prove it, "both of the men believe the founding of Lakeview Academy was racially motivated; that is, to keep Whites and Blacks in segregated schools". (In January 2005, Lakeview advertised in Atlantic Magazine that its enrollment of 530 included 12% students of color. In the 2019–2020 school year the student population was 93.8% White, 2.4% Asian, 2% Hispanic, and 1.7% Black.) 

Construction on "12 classrooms, a library and office" began in 1970 on Lakeview Drive. The first headmaster was Woodrow Light, who officiated on August 22, 1970, at the dedication of the school renamed Lakeview Academy. It had 87 students in first through ninth grades. Headmaster Light wrote, "We began the school year in September with eighty-seven students. The response from students, parents, trustees and friends has been so tremendous that our enrollment has steadily increased to ninety-six with additional applications pending." Enrollment at the end of that first school year surpassed 100 students.

Work on the upper school building was completed in 1973, and then work started on the gym. Enrollment at the end of the school year 1973–974 was 219, and five students were the first graduates. 

Ferrell Singleton served as head of the school from 1979 to 2005. He had a reputation for "building the school for more than two decades". He started the Lakeview Lions football program. Lakeview gives an annual Singleton award "for the student that best exemplifies Lakeview Academy". The middle school building was also named "Singleton Hall" in his honor. By 1999, the school served 450 students.

Jim Robison was head of school from 2005 to 2010. Robison established a tradition of an annual convocation ceremony, during which students in the upper school signed an honor code, "agreeing not to lie, cheat or steal, or approve of those who do". During Robison's time as head, the school completed a $1.5 million expansion of the cafeteria to accommodate 400 students, which was the first stage of a planned $7.5 million expansion to build 15 new classrooms to replace six modular classrooms.

From 2010 to 2019, John Kennedy served as head of school. He oversaw a $3 million capital fundraising campaign to develop a new middle school building. He strengthened the academy's fine arts program, Spanish and mathematics curriculum, and technology focus, especially in robotics. He also added a mentoring program, providing support for students with learning challenges.

Interim head of school John Simpson served for the 2019–2020 school year. He brought 14 years of service at Lakeview, including roles in admission and external relations, and as dean of students and coach.

Kristy Montgomery served as head from 2020 to 2022. Her leadership through the COVID pandemic "resulted in Lakeview staying open throughout 18 months of pandemic restrictions". A group of ten parents protested that "the school's board of trustees, the administration and its COVID-19 task force — which includes a local pediatrician, an emergency physician, and a registered school nurse — unanimously decided on Aug. 8 to mandate masks based on the surge in coronavirus cases in the area". When surveyed in 2020, "97% of parents reported being satisfied with the school's overall response to the coronavirus pandemic, with 75% rating the response as excellent". 

John Simpson's tenure as head of school began in 2022.

Athletics 
Formerly a GHSA member, in 2022 Lakeview Academy changed to a Class AAA member of the Georgia Independent Athletic Association.

Basketball athlete Reno Earls was "a trailblazer, as one of the first black players at Lakeview Academy... one of the best in Hall County in the 1990s. He finished his career with the Lions in 1995 with a school-record 2,041 points." Earls died at age 44 in 2022, of complications due to COVID.

Notable alumni
 Zac Brown, musician
Ralston Cash, professional baseball player
 Dakota Chalmers, professional baseball player
 Matt Dubnik, member of Georgia House of Representatives
Patrick Phillips, poet, professor, and translator

References

External links
 
 Niche reviews

Private K-12 schools in Georgia (U.S. state)
Gainesville, Georgia
Educational institutions established in 1970
Schools in Hall County, Georgia
Preparatory schools in Georgia (U.S. state)
Segregation academies in Georgia
1970 establishments in Georgia (U.S. state)